Several ships of the Argentine Navy have been named ARA Libertad (or Libertad before the 1860s):

 , a brigantine that served as corsair
 , a schooner
 , a schooner
 , a whaler that served in the war between Buenos Aires and the Argentine Confederation
 , a steamship that served in the war between Buenos Aires and the Argentine Confederation
 , a steamship that served in the war against Paraguay
 , a coastal battleship, in service with the Argentine Navy from 1892 to 1947
 , an auxiliary cruiser formerly a transport ship named Eva Peron
 , a sailing frigate launched in 1956, currently in service as training ship with the Argentine Navy

Argentine Navy ship names